The sack of Baturyn, or the Baturyn massacre, was a massacre during the Great Northern War (1700-1721), during which Russian troops under the command of Alexander Danilovich Menshikov captured and destroyed Baturyn on November 2, 1708. The fortress of Baturyn was the capital of Hetman Mazepa at the time; according to various estimates, between 9,000 to 15,000 civilians and defenders of Baturyn were killed.

On the eve of events
During the war's progress, Hetman Mazepa ceased to consider himself loyal to Tsar Peter I and on November 7 (October 28) 1708, when  Charles XII  , who was on his way to Moscow and forced to divert his forces toward Central Ukraine, Mazepa joined the Swedish advance. He was followed by about 3000 Cossacks and leading members of the Zaporozhian Army. Upon learning of Mazepa's desertion to the Swedish side, Peter I ordered General Alexander Menshikov to destroy the Hetmanate's capital.

The course of hostilities
Menshikov, on the eve of the storming of Baturyn, commanded 20 dragoon regiments, numbering from 15 to 20 thousand dragoons. But at that time Baturyn was a fortified fortress, armed with a large number of guns.In view of this, Menshikov tried to persuade the defenders of the fortress to surrender, but the Baturyns not only rejected the offer of capitulation, but also responded with cannon shots at Menshikov's positions. The Russian Army failed to storm the fortified city, and only after penetrating through a secret raid did the twice-superior forces of Menshikov gain the advantage and at 6 o'clock in the morning, November 13 (2), 1708, entered Baturyn territory and insidiously attacked the defenders of the fortress. Despite fierce opposition from the garrison, within two hours, the Russian troops completed the capture of the city. When Hetman Mazepa later saw the consequences of the Baturyn massacre in Moscow, "this spectacle struck him in the heart"; Mazepa wept zealously for Baturyn, watching how much human blood in the city and suburbs was full of puddles.

Description of events in documentary sources 
The bloody events in Baturyn are confirmed by many documentary sources:
Mykola Markevich (1804–1860) writes:
    
Rigelman (1720–1789) describes the events as follows:
    
According to the French historian Jean-Benoit Scherer (1741–1824):

Archaeological research in Baturyn
Archaeological excavations in Baturyn have been conducted by Ukrainian researchers since 1995. In 2001, Canadian scientists joined them.
The Canadian-Ukrainian Studies was sponsored by the Canadian Institute for the Study of Ukraine, the Kowalski Program for the Study of Eastern Ukraine, the Shevchenko American Scientific Society, and the Pontifical Institute for Medieval Studies in Toronto.
In 2003-2004, the Petro Jacyk Center for Ukrainian Historical Research donated funds for the excavations.
In 2005, he began supporting the Baturyn Foundation, founded in the same year by President Victor Yushchenko. The patron and academic advisor is CIUS Director Zenon Kohut. Martin Dimnik from PIMS is in charge of funding and publishing research results. Volodymyr Mezentsev, Candidate of Historical Sciences, University of Toronto, is responsible for the CIUS project. The expedition was led by Volodymyr Kovalenko, Candidate of Historical Sciences, Associate Professor and Head of the Department of History and Archeology of Ukraine, Faculty of History, Taras Shevchenko Chernihiv State Pedagogical University.
In 2005, 150 students and scientists from the Universities of Chernihiv and Nizhyn and the Kyiv-Mohyla Academy took part in the excavations. In 2006 - 120 students and scientists from universities and museums-reserves of Kyiv, Chernihiv, Glukhov, Rivne, Baturyn and the University of Graz (Austria).
In 1996-2007, archaeologists discovered 138 burials in Baturyn during the reign of Ivan Mazepa. 65 of them belong to those killed during the capture of Baturyn (mostly women, children and the elderly). Thus, in 17 of the 33 graves excavated in 2005, skeletons of women and children buried without a position in a coffin and visible signs of Christian rites were found.

Reburial of the victims of the Baturyn tragedy
In 2008, on November 14, as part of the anniversary of the Baturyn tragedy, the first reburial of the remains of Baturyn casualties and civilians took place in the crypt of the Resurrection Church, on the territory of the Baturyn Fortress Citadel Memorial Complex.
In 2010, in honor of the anniversary of the Baturyn tragedy, reburial was also carried out with the remains of defenders and civilians found during regular archeological excavations in Baturyn. The liturgy for the repose of the dead was served by the Metropolitan Archpriest of the Holy Intercession Church of Baturyn, Father Roman.
In November 2013, during the commemoration of the anniversary of the Baturyn tragedy, the remains of people discovered during archeological expeditions on the territory of Baturyn were reburied in 2012-2013. Chicago). Today, more than 500 remains of defenders and civilians resting in 74 coffins have found their eternal peace in the crypt of the church.

Significance of events in modern life of Ukraine
"Baturyn Tragedy" is the official name of the events in Baturyn, which was established by the Cabinet of Ministers of Ukraine on April 2, 2008.
President Victor Yushchenko has stated: "For me, the Baturyn tragedy is associated with the Holodomor of the 1930s, and it is immoral that there is still no monument to the innocent victims." 
On November 21, 2007, the President of Ukraine signed the Decree "On Some Issues of Development of the National Historical and Cultural Reserve" Hetman's Capital "and the Village of Baturyn", which provides for the construction in 2008 of the Memorial Complex in memory of victims of Baturyn.
On November 13, 2008, the Verkhovna Rada of Ukraine observed a minute of silence in memory of the victims of the Baturyn tragedy. The initiator was the head of the Our Ukraine - People's Self-Defense faction Vyacheslav Kyrylenko. 
Since 2018, the Day of Remembrance of the Baturyn Tragedy (November 2, 1708) has been celebrated at the state level in Ukraine.

See also 

 Abolition of the Cossack system in Sloboda Ukraine
 Baturyn Fortress Citadel
 Baturyn Museum of Archeology
 Hetman's Capital
 Liquidation of the autonomy of the Cossack Hetmanate
 Liquidation of the Zaporozhian Sich

Notes

Bibliography
 Pavlenko, S. "Perishing of Baturyn on 2 November 1708". "Ukrainska vydavnycha spilka". Kiev, 2007.
 Pavlenko, S. "Ivan Mazepa". "Alternatyvy". Kiev, 2003.
 Tairova-Yakovleva, T. "Mazepa". "Molodaya gvardiya". Moscow, 2007.

External links
  The Western Europe about Mazepa by the director of the Scientific-Research Institute of Cossackdom at NANU Institute of History
  Pavlenko, S. Baturyn tragedy of 1708: thoughts and facts. All-Ukrainian daily newspaper "Day" #210, 1 December 2007.
  Was Baturyn doomed?
  Petr I. Order to Zaporizhian Host (27 October 1708)
  Petr I. To Prince Menshikov (5 November 1708)

1708 in Russia
1708 in Ukraine
Baturyn
Baturyn
Baturyn
Baturyn
History of Chernihiv Oblast
Ivan Mazepa
Massacres in 1708
Massacres in Ukraine
Military history of Ukraine
Baturyn